Capissa is a monotypic tiger moth genus in the family Erebidae. It was previously treated as a synonym of Eilema. Its only species, Capissa vagesa, is found in the north-western Himalayas, Kashmir, Nepal and Upper Myanmar. Both the genus and species were first described by Frederic Moore; the genus in 1878 and the species in 1860.

Adults have yellow wings, but the forewings have a fold of androconial scales within and along the cubital vein. The hindwings have a darker central patch of androconial scales.

References

Moths described in 1860
Lithosiina
Monotypic moth genera